First Presbyterian Church is a historic Presbyterian church located at Rochester in Monroe County, New York. It is a Gothic Revival–style edifice designed in 1871 by Rochester architect Andrew Jackson Warner.  It is built of Albion sandstone and trimmed with white Medina sandstone.  It features a single stone bell tower and spire at the northeast corner beside the main entrance.  It was the third home for Rochester's oldest congregation. It is now home to the Central Church of Christ.

It was listed on the National Register of Historic Places in 1973.

References

External links

Churches on the National Register of Historic Places in New York (state)
Historic American Buildings Survey in New York (state)
Presbyterian churches in New York (state)
Gothic Revival church buildings in New York (state)
Churches completed in 1871
19th-century Presbyterian church buildings in the United States
Churches in Rochester, New York
National Register of Historic Places in Rochester, New York